Events from the year 1759 in Russia

Incumbents
 Monarch – Elizabeth

Events

 Page Corps

Births

Deaths

References

1759 in Russia
Years of the 18th century in the Russian Empire